Camden Art Centre (formerly known as Hampstead Arts Centre until 1967 and Camden Arts Centre until 2020) is a contemporary art gallery in the London Borough of Camden, England that hosts temporary exhibitions and educational outreach projects. The changing programme includes exhibitions, learning, residencies, off-site projects, artist-led activities and courses.

Activities
Exhibitions feature emerging artists, international artists showing for the first time in London, historic figures who inspire contemporary practice, and thematic group shows. Camden Art Centre also strives to support artists in making new artworks.

Central to its programme is the artist residency programme, which aims to develop artists' practices with practical support, resulting in new work and public participation. Past residency artists include Salvatore Arancio, David Raymond Conroy, Caroline Achaintre, Jesse Wine, Phoebe Cummings, Anne Hardy, Alexandre da Cunha, Emma Hart, Veronica Ryan, Sally O'Reilly, Francis Upritchard, Jonathan Baldock, Mike Nelson, Graham Gussin, Martin Creed, Vivien Blackett, Simon Starling, Adam Chodzko, Athanasios Argianas and Walter Price. More recently, exhibitions including: Olga Balema and Elizabeth Murray. 

Learning activity includes talks and discussions, film screenings and live art performances, alongside family activities, schools' projects led by artists, projects for young people and courses in ceramics, drawing, painting, performance and art theory.

Off-site artists' projects include new commissions and performance in areas such as King's Cross, London and the Borough of Brent, and in local schools and community centres.

Since 2018 there has been a renewed emphasis on public programmes both on and off-site, as well as a developing digital programme that includes a new Camden Art Audio podcast programme.

A shop is on site, as well as a Café and Garden.

Management
Martin Clark has been the director of Camden Art Centre since 2017. He was previously Director of Bergen Kunsthall, Norway (2013–17), Artistic Director of Tate St Ives, (2007–13) and Exhibitions Curator at Arnolfini, Bristol, (2004–07).

Clark succeeded Jenni Lomax OBE, who was the Director of Camden Arts Centre for 27 years, between 1990 and 2017. Under her stewardship, Camden Arts Centre established a programme of exhibitions, including solo shows by Anya Gallaccio, Tal R, Victor Grippo, Yinka Shonibare, Hanne Darboven, Kara Walker, Eva Hesse, Laura Owens, Kerry James Marshall, and  Angela de la Cruz, whose first solo exhibition in the UK, entitled 'After', was held at Camden Arts Centre in April and May 2010. She was nominated for the Turner Prize in 2010.

In 2020 Clark oversaw a rebrand of the organisation with Pentagram, dropping the ‘s’ on ‘Camden Arts Centre’ to become ‘Camden Art Centre’. He has continued to programme international artists for the first time in the UK, including exhibitions by Amy Sillman, Sadie Benning, Elizabeth Murray, Christodoulos Panayiotou and Vivian Suter, as well as providing a space for emerging UK and international artists including Beatrice Gibson, Wong Ping, Julien Creuzet and Walter Price, some of whom were supported through the Camden Art Centre Emerging Artist Prize at Frieze, which he established in 2018.

History
Camden Art Centre is situated at the corner of Arkwright Road and Finchley Road, NW3 in a Grade II listed premises, constructed as Hampstead Central Library and designed by the architect Arnold Taylor. The building was opened in 1897 by its benefactor Sir Henry Harben, then Deputy Chairman of the Prudential Assurance Company. The Victorian structure funded by Harben survived World War II, despite hits by enemy incendiary bombs in 1940 and the blast from a V2 rocket in 1945.

The library grew in size and was extended in the 1920s, however by 1964 a new facility opened in Swiss Cottage which was better able to cope with the demands of the modern library service and all stock was transferred to it.

The Centre was founded in 1965 in West Hampstead. It was originally named Hampstead Arts Centre and renamed "Camden Arts Centre" in 1967. It provided the local community with classes in painting, life drawing, pottery, printing and basic design. The first exhibition was held a year after the Centre was established.

Jenni Lomax OBE joined Camden Art Centre in 1990, and established a programme of exhibitions, residencies, artists' projects and public events. She led the organisation through a major building refurbishment scheme which was completed in early 2004 by Tony Fretton Architects.

Martin Clark became the Centre's new Director in 2017.

It was rebranded "Camden Art Centre" in 2020.

References

External links
 Official website
 

Grade II listed buildings in the London Borough of Camden
Arts centres in London
Tourist attractions in the London Borough of Camden